This is a list of moths of the family Psychidae that are found in India. It also acts as an index to the species articles and forms part of the full List of moths of India.

Subfamily Oiketicinae

Genus Dappula
 Dappula tertia Templeton, 1847 (= Oeceticus tertius (Templeton, 1847) sensu Hampson, 1892)

Genus Eumeta 
 Eumeta crameri (Westwood, 1854) (= Clania crameri (Westwood, 1854) sensu Hampson, 1892)
 Eumeta variegata (Snellen, 1879) (= Clania variegata (Snellen, 1879) sensu Hampson, 1892)

Genus Acanthopsyche

 Acanthopsyche bipars Walker, 1865 (= Acanthospyche (Oeceticoides) bipars (Walker, 1865) sensu Hampson, 1892)

 Acanthopsyche cana Hampson, 1892 (= Acanthospyche (Oeceticoides) cana Hampson, 1892 [1893] sensu Hampson, 1892)

Subfamily Psychinae

Genus Psyche

Subgenus Manatha
 Manatha albipes Moore

Subgenus Heyla
 Heyla griseata Hampson
 Heyla fusca Hampson
 Heyla nudilineata Hampson

Subgenus Chalioides
 Chalioides vitrea Hampson

Subgenus Eurycyttarus
 Eurycyttarus pileata Hampson
 Eurycyttarus nigra Hampson
 Eurycyttarus rotunda Hampson
 Eurycyttarus decemvena Hampson

Subgenus Barandra
 Barandra fumata Moore

Subfamily Chaliinae

Genus Kotochalia
  Westwood

Genus Mahasena
 Mahasena andamana Moore
 Mahasena hockingij Moore

Genus Pteroxys
 Pteroxys goniatus Hampson
 Pteroxys uniformis Hampson

Subfamily Canephorinae

Genus Moffatia
 Moffatia plumicauda Moore

Subfamily Psychoidinae

Genus Diabasis
 Diabasis nilgirensis Hampson

Genus Aprata
 Aprata mackwoodi Moore

Subfamily unassigned

Genus Bambalina
 Bambalina consorta (Templeton, 1847) (= Amatissa consorta (Templeton, 1847) sensu Hampson, 1892)

Genus Kophene
 Kophene cuprea Moore, 1892 (= Amatissa cuprea (Moore, 1892) sensu Hampson, 1892)
 Kophene snelleni Heylaerts, 1890 (= Acanthospyche (Metisa) snelleni (Heylaerts, 1890) sensu Hampson, 1892)
 Kophene minor Moore, 1879 (= Acanthospyche (Oeceticoides) minor (Moore, 1879) sensu Hampson, 1892)

Genus Dasaratha
 Dasaratha himalayana Moore, 1888 (= Acanthospyche (Dasaratha) himalayana (Moore, 1888) sensu Hampson, 1892)

Genus Urobarba
 Urobarba longicauda Warren, 1888 (= Acanthospyche (Dasaratha) longicauda (Warren, 1888) sensu Hampson, 1892)

Genus Brachycyttarus
 Brachycyttarus subteralbatus Hampson, 1892 (= Acanthospyche (Brachycyttarus) subteralbata Hampson, 1892 [1893] sensu Hampson, 1892)

Genus Pteroma
 plagiophleps Hampson, 1892 (= Acanthospyche (Pteroma) plagiophleps Hampson, 1892 [1893] sensu Hampson, 1892)

Genus Metisa
 Metisa plana Walker, 1883 (= Acanthospyche (Metisa) plana (Walker, 1883) sensu Hampson, 1892)
 Metisa moorei (Heylaerts, 1890) (= Acanthospyche (Metisa) moorei (Heylaerts, 1890) sensu Hampson, 1892)

Genus Narycia
 Narycia berecynthia Meyrick, 1931

Genus Psomocolax
 Psomocolax rhabdophora (Hampson, 1892) (= Acanthospyche (Amicta) rhabdophora (Hampson, 1892 [1893]) sensu Hampson, 1892)

Genus Acanthoecia
 Acanthoecia larminati (Heylaerts, 1904)

Genus Sapheneutis
Sapheneutis crocotricha Meyrick, 1910
Sapheneutis colocynthia Meyrick, 1916
Sapheneutis galerita Meyrick, 1911

Genus Typhonia
Typhonia autochthonia  (Meyrick, 1931)
Typhonia brachiata  (Meyrick, 1919)
Typhonia campestris  (Meyrick, 1916)
Typhonia certatrix  (Meyrick, 1916)
Typhonia coagulata  (Meyrick, 1919)
Typhonia colonica  (Meyrick, 1916)
Typhonia cremata  (Meyrick, 1916)
Typhonia deposita  (Meyrick, 1919)
Typhonia exsecrata  (Meyrick, 1937)
Typhonia gregaria  (Meyrick, 1916)
Typhonia imparata  (Meyrick, 1928)
Typhonia infensa  (Meyrick, 1916)
Typhonia isopeda  (Meyrick, 1907)
Typhonia jactata  (Meyrick, 1937)
Typhonia lignosa  (Meyrick, 1917)
Typhonia meliphaea  (Meyrick, 1916)
Typhonia multiplex  (Meyrick, 1917)
Typhonia nota  (Meyrick, 1919)
Typhonia obtrectans  (Meyrick, 1930)
Typhonia onthostola  (Meyrick, 1937)(
Typhonia paraclasta  (Meyrick, 1922)
Typhonia paricropa  (Meyrick, 1907)
Typhonia pericrossa  (Meyrick, 1907)
Typhonia phaeogenes  (Meyrick, 1919)
Typhonia praecepta  (Meyrick, 1916)
Typhonia ptyalistis  (Meyrick, 1937)
Typhonia ramifera  (Meyrick, 1916)
Typhonia rhythmopis  (Meyrick, 1928) (Andamans)
Typhonia semota  (Meyrick, 1937)
Typhonia subacta  (Meyrick, 1919)
Typhonia tylota  (Meyrick, 1916)
Typhonia vorticosa  (Meyrick, 1930)

See also
Psychidae (bagworm moths)
Moths
Lepidoptera
List of moths of India

References
 Hampson, G.F. et al. (1892–1937) Fauna of British India Including Ceylon and Burma - Moths. Vols. 1-5 cxix + 2813 p - 1295 figs - 1 table - 15 pl (12 in col.)
 Kendrick, R.C., 2002 [2003]. Moths (Insecta: Lepidoptera) of Hong Kong. Ph.D. thesis, The University of Hong Kong. xvi + 660 pp. 
 Savela, Markku. Website on Lepidoptera and Some Other Life Forms - page on family Psychidae (Accessed 8 July 2007).

 
x
M